The Schneider Euro PC was a PC compatible home computer, introduced in 1988 by the Schneider Computer Division.

A follow-up to the success of the Schneider CPC series, the Euro PC offered an inexpensive entry into the emerging market for home PCs. The computer used a Siemens 8088 processor (clocked at 4.77, 7.15 or 9.54 MHz according to a BIOS setting or key combination), had 512 KB of RAM (expandable to 640 KB), and was shipped with MS-DOS 3.3 and Microsoft Works 1.0.

As with many other home computers of its time, the computer circuit board was built into the keyboard housing. A 12" amber monochrome monitor (MM12) and a 14" color monitor (CM14) were available for the system. The Euro PC had a graphics chip that could be switched between monochrome Hercules and color CGA modes. The power supply was external, an unusual feature for a PC.

A 3-inch floppy disk drive (720 KB) was installed as a mass storage device. An external 3-inch floppy disk drive with 720 KB (FD720), a 5-inch floppy disk drive with 360 KB (FD360), and a 20 MB hard disk (XT Attachment, similar to IDE / ATA ) were available as accessories. This could not be replaced by any other model, as the drive parameters were permanently programmed into the BIOS. However, it was possible to operate other hard drives with a corresponding controller in the expansion slot.

The computer was sold through large mail-order companies at a price of 1,800 DEM. The highly competitive PC market left little room for new machines, but the Euro PC was still sold in considerable numbers thanks to its very low price and slim, home computer-like appearance.

An updated version, the Euro PC II introduced in 1989, had 768 KB RAM and a 8087 mathematical coprocessor. Another version with further expansions was called EURO XT.
The Euro AT offered a 80286 processor, 1MB of RAM, and a EGA graphics card. The Euro SX, introduced in 1992, came with a 80386SX processor.

Technical details

See also
PC compatible
PC AT
Sinclair PC200

References

Schneider Electric
Home computers
IBM PC compatibles